Gast Corner is an unincorporated community in Prospect Township, Marion County, Ohio, United States.

References

Unincorporated communities in Marion County, Ohio